Nakka Afghan (Pashto and Urdu: نکہ افغان) is a village situated in Jand Tehsil of Attock District in Punjab Province of Pakistan.

Geography 
It is located near Makhad along the bank of Indus River. Nakkah Afghan is the village inhabited by Afghan tribe Saghri Khattak of area Narrah.

History 
Saghri Khattak is branch of the Bulaki Khattaks. Beyond any doubt the Saghri Khattaks came across the river from Kohat and drove out the Awans. Whom they found in possession. They are said to have conquered the Awan country as far east as the Jhelum. During Ahmad Shah Durrani and Akbar time Khattaks were all across the river. There's no historical record of their connection with this district before Durrani invasion. Haddowali is said to be their last village and boundary on the east where Awans are their neighbors.

Climate 
Nakka Afghan is situated in Potohar Plateau of Pakistan. In summer the weather gets very hot and in the winter temperature gets very cold.

References

Villages in Attock District